Noam Fritz Emeran (born 24 September 2002) is a French footballer who plays as a forward for Manchester United.

Club career

Early career
Born in Paray-le-Monial, France, Emeran started his career with Belgian side FC Brussels, before joining the academy of Entente SSG. Following this, he spent a couple of seasons with Amiens, and reportedly attracted the attention of Barcelona, Juventus and Paris Saint-Germain. He ultimately joined English side Manchester United in February 2019, after prolonged negotiations.

Manchester United
Emeran signed his first professional contract with Manchester United in November 2019.

International career
Emeran has represented France at youth international level. He is eligible to represent Rwanda through his mother.

Personal life
He is the son of former professional footballer Fritz Emeran. He is of Guadeloupean descent through his father, and of Rwandan descent through his mother.

Career statistics

References

2002 births
Living people
People from Paray-le-Monial
French footballers
France youth international footballers
French people of Guadeloupean descent
French people of Rwandan descent
Association football forwards
Entente SSG players
Amiens SC players
Manchester United F.C. players
French expatriate footballers
French expatriate sportspeople in Belgium
Expatriate footballers in Belgium
French expatriate sportspeople in England
Expatriate footballers in England
Sportspeople from Saône-et-Loire
Footballers from Bourgogne-Franche-Comté